William Michael Anthony Jackson (born March 22, 1985) is an American mixed martial artist. Jackson last competed in the Welterweight division of the Ultimate Fighting Championship (UFC).

Background
Mike Jackson is the son of a white father and mixed-race mother. Jackson grew up in The Woodlands, where he participated in badminton. He attended and remains an avid fan of the Vidor High School Rebels. Jackson met current UFC matchmaker Mick Maynard, when he was still president of Houston-based promotion Legacy FC, in 2008  while working a part time job delivering newspapers for Maynard's print publication, Maroon Weekly. This friendship would eventually lead to Jackson working as a photographer for Maynard at Legacy FC and produced online content around the events.

Mixed martial arts career

Early career
Jackson made his amateur debut under the Lonestar Beatdown banner in September, 2009. He lost the bout by unanimous decision.

Ultimate Fighting Championship
Jackson made his professional and promotional debut on February 6, 2016, at UFC Fight Night 82, where he faced fellow newcomer Mickey Gall. Jackson lost the fight by submission just 45 seconds into the first round.

He was expected to face Jacob Capelli at XKO 34 on January 28, 2017 but the bout was cancelled. Instead Jackson faced Bellator MMA fighter Jeremie Holloway in a Muay Thai bout. Jackson lost by unanimous decision.

He was expected to face Rafael Justino at LFA 18 on August 4, 2017, but the bout was cancelled.

Jackson next faced CM Punk at UFC 225 on June 9, 2018. Jackson dominated the largely uneventful fight, winning via unanimous decision. Three years after the bout, it was made public that the result was overturned to a no contest by IDFPR after Jackson tested positive for marijuana and was suspended for three months.

A welterweight bout between Jackson and Dean Barry was briefly linked to UFC on ESPN: Chiesa vs. Magny in January, but it was pulled due to undisclosed reasons. They were expected to meet at UFC on ESPN: Reyes vs. Procházka on May 1, 2021. However, in March, Barry revealed that he was not able to obtain a visa in time for the bout so it was pulled once again. The bout was then booked for the third time to take place at UFC Fight Night: Lemos vs. Andrade on April 23, 2022. Jackson won the fight via disqualification in the first round after being rendered unable to continue due to an intentional eye gouge.

Jackson faced Pete Rodriguez  on October 15, 2022, at UFC Fight Night 212. He lost the fight via knockout in round one.

On January 9, 2023, it was announced that Jackson was released from the UFC, despite having one bout left on his contract.

Controversies 
Jackson was involved in an altercation with Jake Shields in December of 2022 due to Jackson's tweets, which Shields described as racist and anti-white.

Further career
He is also a professional kickboxer with a record of 1–1 and a professional boxer with a record of 4–0.

He is a photographer and videographer for mixed martial arts promotion Legacy Fighting Alliance.

Mixed martial arts record

|-
|Loss
|align=center|1–2 (1)
|Pete Rodriguez
|KO (punches and knee)
|UFC Fight Night: Grasso vs. Araújo
|
|align=center|1
|align=center|1:33
|Las Vegas, Nevada, United States
|
|-
|Win
|align=center|1–1 (1)
|Dean Barry
|DQ (eye gouging)
|UFC Fight Night: Lemos vs. Andrade
|
|align=center|1
|align=center|3:52
|Las Vegas, Nevada, United States
|
|-
|NC
|align=center| 0–1 (1)
|CM Punk
|NC (overturned)
|UFC 225
|
|align=center|3
|align=center|5:00
|Chicago, Illinois, United States
|
|-
| Loss
| align=center| 0–1
| Mickey Gall
| Submission (rear-naked choke)
| UFC Fight Night: Hendricks vs. Thompson
| 
| align=center| 1
| align=center| 0:45
| Las Vegas, Nevada, United States
|

Professional boxing record

See also 
 List of male mixed martial artists

References

External links 
  
 

1985 births
Living people
American male mixed martial artists
Welterweight mixed martial artists
Mixed martial artists utilizing boxing
Mixed martial artists utilizing Muay Thai
Ultimate Fighting Championship male fighters
American male boxers
American male kickboxers
American Muay Thai practitioners
American photographers
American bloggers